José Pérez (born 10 October 1965) is a Puerto Rican judoka. He competed in the men's half-lightweight event at the 1996 Summer Olympics.

References

1965 births
Living people
Puerto Rican male judoka
Olympic judoka of Puerto Rico
Judoka at the 1996 Summer Olympics
Place of birth missing (living people)